Tackley Farm, also known as Valley View, is a Greek Revival farmhouse near Shenandoah Junction, West Virginia.  The property was leased by Michael Blue in 1777 from Colonel Richard Blackburn, the original grantee who migrated from England and acquired over 2000 acres in 1754. In 1757, Michael Blue and his brother had served with Blackburn in the foot Army of Col. Armstrong in Delaware. In 1795, Michael Blue purchased his 150 acres from Blackburn's son Thomas. In 1840, Michael Blue's son Joel built the present house.

The house closely resembles Belvedere, near Charles Town.

References

Houses on the National Register of Historic Places in West Virginia
Houses in Jefferson County, West Virginia
Greek Revival houses in West Virginia
Houses completed in 1840
Farms on the National Register of Historic Places in West Virginia
National Register of Historic Places in Jefferson County, West Virginia